Aglaya Viktorovna Tarasova (born April 18, 1994) is a Russian actress. She is best known for her role in a romantic drama  Ice (as Nadya Lapshina). Winner of the Golden Eagle Award (2019) for the best female movie role.

Biography
Darya-Aglaya Tarasova was born in Saint Petersburg, Russia. 
Daughter of actress Kseniya Rappoport and businessman Viktor Tarasov. She studied at the St. Petersburg State University. She has never gone through actor's education.

Filmography

References

External links

Муз и див русского юмора Александр Гудков и актриса Аглая Тарасова в февральской фотосессии для журнала «Собака.ru»

1994 births
Living people
Russian film actresses
Russian television actresses
Russian voice actresses
Russian people of Jewish descent
Actresses from Saint Petersburg
21st-century Russian actresses
Russian child actresses